The Ranchi - Chopan Express  is an express train belonging to South Eastern Railway zone that runs between Ranchi Junction and Chopan in India. It is currently being operated with 18613/18614 train numbers on tri-weekly basis.

Service

The 18613/Ranchi - Chopan Express has an average speed of 47 km/hr and covers 476 km in 10h 5m. The 18614/Chopan - Ranchi Express has an average speed of 42 km/hr and covers 476 km in 11h 25m.

Route and halts 

The important halts of the train are:

Coach composite

The train has standard ICF rakes with a max speed of 110 kmph. The train consists of 12 coaches :

 10 General Unreserved
 2 Seating cum Luggage Rake

Traction

Both trains are hauled by a Tatanagar Loco Shed based WAG-5 electric locomotive from Ranchi to Chopan.

Notes

See also 

 Ranchi Junction railway station
 Chopan railway station

References

External links 

 18613/Ranchi - Chopan Express
 18614/Chopan - Ranchi Express

Transport in Ranchi
Express trains in India
Rail transport in Jharkhand
Rail transport in Uttar Pradesh
Railway services introduced in 2009